Sinomonas halotolerans is a Gram-positive, aerobic and non-motile bacterium from the genus Sinomonas which has been isolated from soil from Halong Bay in Vietnam.

References

Bacteria described in 2016
Micrococcaceae